The following list is a partial discography of productions by Chad Hugo. For songs produced by The Neptunes, see The Neptunes production discography.

1995

Average Guyz - First Come First Served   
7. "Ride"

2003

Kenna - New Sacred Cow 
(All tracks produced with Kenna)
1. "Within Earshot"
2. "Freetime"
3. "Man Fading"
4. "Sunday After You"
5. "Vexed and Glorious / A Better Control"
6. "Red Man"
7. "Hell Bent"
10. "New Sacred Cow"
11. "I'm Gone"
12. "Siren"
13. "Love/Hate Sensation"

2005

Jesse McCartney - She's No You (Remix) 
1. "She's No You" (Remix featuring Fabolous)
2. "She's No You" (Remix)

2007

Kenna - The Black Goodbye EP  
All tracks (produced with Kenna)

Kenna - Make Sure They See My Face 
(All tracks produced with Kenna)
1. "Daylight"
2. "Out of Control (State of Emotion)"
5. "Sun Red Sky Blue"
6. "Baptized in Blacklight"
8. "Phantom Always" (featuring Justin Timberlake) (produced with Justin Timberlake)
9. "Face the Gun / Good Luck"
10. "Better Wise Up"
12. "Wide Awake"

Kings of Leon - Charmer 
2. "My Party" (Chad Hugo & Kenna remix) (produced with Kenna)

2008

Ashlee Simpson - Bittersweet World 
(All tracks produced with Kenna)
2. "Boys" (produced with Jack Joseph Puig)
4. "No Time for Tears" 
9. "Hot Stuff"
12. "Follow You Wherever You Go"

Kevin Rudolf - In the City 
10. "She Can Get It" (produced with Kevin Rudolf)

Sierra Swan - Queen of the Valley 
4. "Sex Is Keeping Us Together" 
5. "Nuclear Letdown"

2010

All-American Rejects - Move Along (Chad Hugo remix)   
1. "Move Along" (Chad Hugo remix)

JoJo - Can't Take That Away from Me 
3. "Pretty Please" (produced with Kenna)

Kenna - Download to Donate for Haiti 
3. "Never Let Me Down" (produced with Mike Shinoda)

2011

E-40 - Revenue Retrievin': Overtime Shift 
7. "Beastin'"

Kenna - Land 2 Air Chronicles I: Chaos and the Darkness 
All tracks (produced with Kenna)

2012

Stalley - Savage Journey To The American Dream 
9. "Everything New"

2013

Kenna - Land 2 Air Chronicles II: Imitation Is Suicide Chapter 1 
All tracks (produced with Kenna)

Yuna - Nocturnal 
6. "Someone Who Can"

No Malice - Hear Ye Him 
17. "No Time"

The Internet - Feel Good 
3. "Dontcha" (produced with The Internet and Mike Einziger)

2014

Kid Sister - Kid Sister's DUSK2DAWN: The Diary Of Jane Jupiter 
11. "Higher"
13. "Higher (Sex Edit)"

Little Dragon - Killing Me (Chad Hugo Remix) 
1. Killing Me "(Chad Hugo Remix)"

St. Vincent - Digital Witness (Chad Hugo Remix) 
1. Digital Witness "(Chad Hugo Remix)"

2016

Fugitive 9 - Vision Alpha 
8. "Landmines"

SG Lewis - Yours (EP) 
3. "Meant to Be" (produced with SG Lewis)

2017

Jallal - Off the Radar 
13. "Toss & Turn" (feat. Ne-Yo) (produced with Elliot James and Jan Fairchild)

2018

Sierra Swan - Caterwaul 
1. "Caterwaul"
2. "Duel Of The FareWillMeNots"
3. "Purple Forever"
4. "Rusted Girl"
5. "System Breaker"

2019

Aaron Carpenter - Attitude (Single) 
1. "Attitude" (produced with SG Lewis)

2020

Bryce Vine - Baby Girl (Single) 
1. Baby Girl (produced with Sir Nolan and Simon Says)

2021

SG Lewis - Times 
7. "Chemicals" (produced with SG Lewis and Julian Bunetta)

BROCKHAMPTON - Roadrunner: New Light, New Machine 
 10. "When I Ball" (produced with Baird and Goldwash)

Col3trane - 2AM 
 1. "2AM" (produced with Lido)

Rakeem Miles - It Is What It Is  
 1. "It Is What It Is"

2022

Eyedress - In the Dog House 
 2. "Dream Dealer"

Hudson Mohawke - Cry Sugar 
 11. "Redeem" (produced with Hudson Mohawke)

Keith Ape - Ape Into Space 
 1. "Mull"

References

Hugo, Chad